Gymnopilus jalapensis is a species of mushroom in the family Hymenogastraceae.

See also

List of Gymnopilus species

External links
Gymnopilus jalapensis at Index Fungorum

jalapensis
Fungi of North America
Taxa named by William Alphonso Murrill